Francis Walker (June 22, 1764 – March 1806) was an American planter and politician from Albemarle County, Virginia. He was member of the Virginia House of Delegates in 1788-91 and again in 1797-1801. He represented Virginia in the U.S. Congress from 1793 to 1795.

Biography
Francis was the second son, and one of twelve children of Dr. Thomas (1715–1794) and Mildred Walker. His mother was the widow of Nicholas Meriwhether and through her he inherited the estate at Castle Hill in Albemarle County. His older brother John represented Virginia in the Continental Congress and the U.S. Senate.

Francis married Jane Byrd Nelson, daughter of General Hugh Nelson, and granddaughter William Nelson who had been President of the Council and acting governor of Colonial Virginia. They had two daughters: Jane and Judith. Judith married William C. Rives who was later a U.S. Senator for Virginia.

Besides his state and federal service, Walker was a judge in Albemarle County, and Colonel of the county's militia. He died at home in 1806 and was buried in a family plot on his estate of  Castle Hill.

Castle Hill (Virginia) still stands and is on the National Register of Historic Places. It is off Virginia Highway 231, north of Interstate 64 and northeast of the community of Cismont in Albemarle County. The property was sold in 2003 for 24 million (U.S. dollars). There is a roadside historic marker, but the estate itself is private property.

External links

Walker's Congressional biography

1764 births
1806 deaths
Members of the United States House of Representatives from Virginia
Members of the Virginia House of Delegates
American planters
18th-century American politicians
19th-century American politicians
People from Albemarle County, Virginia